Stevović is a Serbo-Croatian surname derived from a masculine given name Stevo. Notable people with the surname include:

Marko Stevović (born 1996), Serbian alpine skier
Ratko Stevović (born 1956), Montenegrin football manager

See also
 Stević
 Stevanović

Serbian surnames
Montenegrin surnames
Slavic-language surnames
Patronymic surnames
Surnames from given names